Stenolicmus ix is a species of catfish in the family Trichomycteridae- also called the Pencil or Parasitic Catfishes. It was described from the Curuá River, in the Brazilian state of Pará, which is part of the Amazon River basin.

Taxonomy and naming
S. ix is placed in the catfish family Trichomycteridae, the members of which are often referred to as Pencil catfishes and/or Parasitic catfishes. It is further places in the genus Stenolicmus, which was erected in 1990 to accommodate S. ix's sister species Stenolicmus sarmientoi, which was described from Bolivia.

Etymologically,  Stenolicmus ix is a blend of Greek and Mayan. The species name ix is a Mayan word used to describe the jaguar; S. ix was named in reference to the grouping of jaguar-like spots on the fish's dorsal surface.

Description
S. ix is most physically similar to its sister species, S. sarmientoi. The head of this species is relatively small, and more dorso-ventrally compressed than the body, the overall dorsal surface of which is flat. Its branchial membranes are united to the isthmus, and its gill openings are unconstricted. The eyes, which sit dorso-laterally on the head, are small, with well-defined margins and distinct, integument-covered lenses. The posterior naris is round in shape, and similar in size to the eyes.

The coloration of this species is mostly a uniform tan or cream that lightens somewhat ventrally. The spots, from which the species was named, are present on the dorsal surface and appear as dark brown, irregular blotches.

Distribution and habitat
Presently, S. ix is only known from its type locality, which is an unnamed tributary of the Rio Curuá in the lower Amazon basin near  Alenquer, Pará State, Brazil. The holotype of this species was collected from a lotic area in a small stream which was approximately 5m wide and less than 1m deep. The margins of the stream were dominated by amphibious vegetation and a large amount of leaf litter was present on the bottom of the stream, though the fish itself is thought to dwell in the sand. S. ix was found to co-occur with 15 other species of fishes from orders such as the Characiformes, Perciformes, and other catfishes (Siluriformes).

References

Fish of the Amazon basin
Trichomycteridae
Freshwater fish of Brazil
Fish described in 2011